Lord Taylor may refer to:

 Baron Isidore Justin Séverin Taylor (1789–1860), a royal commissioner of the Théâtre-Français
 Bernard Taylor, Baron Taylor of Mansfield (1895–1991), British coalminer and politician, Labour Party MP
 Francis Taylor, Baron Taylor of Hadfield (1905–1995), founder of the housebuilder Taylor Woodrow
 Stephen Taylor, Baron Taylor (1910–1988), the sixth life peer to be created (1958)
 Thomas Taylor, Baron Taylor of Gryfe (1912–2001), British politician
 Tom Taylor, Baron Taylor of Blackburn (1929–2016), Labour member of the House of Lords
 Peter Taylor, Baron Taylor of Gosforth (1930–1997), Lord Chief Justice of England and Wales from 1992 to 1996
 Matthew Taylor, Baron Taylor of Goss Moor (born 1963), Liberal Democrat peer
 John Taylor, Baron Taylor of Holbeach (born 1943), created a Conservative peer in 2006
 John Taylor, Baron Taylor of Warwick (born 1952), the first black Conservative peer

See also
 Lord & Taylor, department store chain
 Baroness Taylor (disambiguation)